Ready4 is a test preparation and college admissions services startup company.

Ready4  was chosen among EdTech 20, the twenty most innovative educational technology companies, in 2016. It was a finalist in MassChallenge's 2013 accelerator, as well as a semi-finalist in 2013 MIT $100K Entrepreneurship Competition.

History

The company was founded by Israeli tech entrepreneur and former Israeli professional basketball player, Elad Shoushan. A graduate of MIT's Sloan School of Management, Shoushan led the company from inception to exit. He started the company after failing the GMAT a few times and became motivated to create a mobile platform that would turn test prep into a more personalized experience.

The Prep4GMAT app was originally coded for iOS. Shoushan launched the Android version in August 2014 and raised $3 million from TAL Education Group, Atlas Venture, Jamie McCourt, Yongjin Group and Zhen Fund.

The company raised $5.33 million in Series A funding in March 2016. The round was led by Square Peg Capital and included Accomplice, as well as various angel investors. At the time, the apps were being used by half a million students worldwide.

In 2019, Ready4 was acquired by TAL Education Group (NYSE:TAL) to provide Ready4's offering at a larger scale.

References

External links
 

Test preparation companies
Educational software companies
American companies established in 2012
2012 establishments in Massachusetts
Software companies based in Massachusetts
Technology companies based in the Boston area
Virtual learning environments
Privately held companies based in Massachusetts
Defunct software companies of the United States
2012 establishments in the United States
Software companies established in 2012
Companies established in 2012